|}

The Sandown Mile is a Group 2 flat horse race in Great Britain open to horses aged four years or older. It is run over a distance of 1 mile (1,609 metres) at Sandown Park in late April.

History
The event was established in 1985, and it was initially sponsored by Trusthouse Forte. The first running was won by Pebbles.

Subsequent sponsors of the race have included KLM uk, At the Races and Betfred. The online gambling company Bet365 became the sponsor in 2008, and the event is currently known as the Bet365 Mile.

The Sandown Mile is staged during a two-day meeting which features both flat and jump races. Other events at the meeting include the Bet365 Gold Cup, the Celebration Chase, the Gordon Richards Stakes and the Sandown Classic Trial.

Records
Most successful horse (2 wins):
 Hurricane Alan – 2004, 2005
 Paco Boy – 2009, 2010

Leading jockey (5 wins):
 Richard Hughes – Major Cadeaux (2008), Paco Boy (2009, 2010), Dick Turpin (2011), Trumpet Major (2013)

Leading trainer (7 wins):
 Richard Hannon Sr. – Hurricane Alan (2004, 2005), Major Cadeaux (2008), Paco Boy (2009, 2010), Dick Turpin (2011), Trumpet Major (2013)

Winners

See also
 Horse racing in Great Britain
 List of British flat horse races

References

 Paris-Turf:
 Racing Post:

 galopp-sieger.de – Sandown Mile.
 ifhaonline.org – International Federation of Horseracing Authorities – Bet365 Mile (2019).
 pedigreequery.com – Sandown Park Mile – Sandown Park.
 

Open mile category horse races
Sandown Park Racecourse
Flat races in Great Britain
1985 establishments in England
Recurring sporting events established in 1985